Pennsbury may refer to:

Pennsbury Manor, the home of Pennsylvania founder William Penn
Pennsbury High School, a school near Pennsbury Manor that is a namesake of it
Pennsbury School District, the school district near Pennsbury Manor that is a namesake of it
Pennsbury Village, Pennsylvania
Pennsbury Township, Pennsylvania